The Shield: Music From the Streets is a collection of songs taken from the FX Networks TV series The Shield.

Track listing
"The Shield Theme"
"Hating Hollywood" by Theory of a Deadman
"Death March" by Black Label Society
"Bring 'Em Out Dead" by Onyx
"Lay Down" by Mikal Raymo
"Perkins" by Peyote Asesino
"Caught Up in the System" by SX-10
"Freedom Band" by Delinquent Habits
"Pride" by Damageplan
"Nothing's Clear" by Ill Niño
"Rushing In" by Crazy Anglos
"No Muerdas La Mano" by Kinto Sol
"Breakdown" by Tantric
"Betrayal" by The Black Maria
"Let's Ride" by Conejo (rapper)
"Ooohhhwee" by Master P
"Mafia" by Kelis
"Cuiden a Los Niños" by Brujeria
"The Shield" by Roc Raida Feat. DJ Paradime

Television soundtracks
2005 soundtrack albums